Aaron Hadlow (born 4 October 1988) is a professional kiteboarder who has won the Pro Kiteboard Riders' Association (PKRA) World Championships five times.

His domination of the sport began in 2004, first encountering substantial competition in the form of Ruben Lenten and Kevin Langeree in 2006.

He also won the Red Bull KitePunks event in 2007, held in La Manga, Spain, beating off stiff competition from Ruben Lenten in 2nd, and Neil Hilder in 3rd.

Hadlow has continued to expand his repertoire of tricks to keep him in front of the competition. A lot of these tricks have stemmed from influences by Lewis Crathern and Neil Hilder, who are a part of recently created Team Bosch alongside Hadlow. Many of his new tricks involve an "ole" move, where the bar and lines are whipped over head - the first of which was the Bosch Mobe. 

He is sponsored mainly by Duotone, Red Bull, Chiemsee, and Lost Cause Boards.

Hadlow has taken a break from the Professional Kiteboard Riders Association World tour in 2010, he is looking to focus on international promos, and various other events. He also looks to continue his "on the loose" series with Ruben Lenten.

In 2015 and 2016, Hadlow won the Red Bull King of the Air in Cape Town, South Africa.

External links
Official site
Live Results for the PKRA World Tour

References

1988 births
Living people
British kitesurfers
Male kitesurfers